Fahad Jaber Al-Marri (born 1986) is a Qatari professional football referee. He has been a full international for FIFA from 2012 to 2018. He refereed some matches in AFC Champions League.

References 

1986 births
Living people
Qatari football referees